The KSS-III submarine, also classified as the Dosan Ahn Changho-class submarines - is a series of diesel-electric attack submarines currently being built for the Republic of Korea Navy (ROKN), jointly by Daewoo Shipbuilding & Marine Engineering (DSME) and Hyundai Heavy Industries (HHI). The KSS-III is the final phase of the Korean Attack Submarine program, a three-phased program to build 27 attack submarines for the ROKN, between 1994–2029.

The KSS-III initiative consists of the development of nine diesel-electric attack submarines, capable of firing submarine-launched ballistic missiles (SLBM), to be built in three batches, between 2014–2029.

A total of three submarines of the first batch of the series have been launched, with the first submarine, being commissioned on 13 August 2019.

Design

Background

The design of the KSS-III was jointly designed by Daewoo Shipbuilding & Marine Engineering (DSME) and Hyundai Heavy Industries (HHI) - two of South Korea's largest shipbuilding enterprises; preparations for the design began in 2007. The KSS-III are the largest submarines to ever be built by South Korea and are reportedly based on the design of the German-origin Type 214 submarine - developed by ThyssenKrupp Marine Systems (TKMS) and license-built by both DSME and HHI, between 2002-2020.

Batch-I

The Batch-I series is the first phase of the KSS-III program - consisting of the construction of three attack submarines - with the first two to be built by DSME and the third one to be built by HHI.

According to DSME, over 76% of the submarine's components were procured from within South Korea.

The design further incorporates an indigenously-designed fuel-cell powered air-independent propulsion (AIP) module - which enables the submarine to conduct long-distance underwater operations for up to 20 days.

The design accommodates six Korean Vertical Launching System (K-VLS) cells, located behind the submarine's sail - for carrying six Hyunmoo 4-4 submarine-launched ballistic missiles (SLBM), along with six  forward-firing torpedo tubes, located at the bow. Coincidentally, the KSS-III is the first ever AIP-equipped attack-submarine, capable of launching submarine-launched ballistic missiles.

Batch-II

The Batch-II series constitutes the second phase of the KSS-III program - and is noted to possess multiple improvements in terms of design, armament and automation, over the Batch-I series.

According to DSME, the Batch-II series will be equipped with "a greater level of South Korean technology" - with over 80% of the submarine's parts to be domestically sourced.

A notable feature of the Batch-II submarines is its lithium-ion battery technology (LiB); the Batch-II series will be equipped with lithium-ion batteries - developed by Samsung SDI (and supplied by Hanwha Defense), apart from the AIP system. Compared to previous lead-acid batteries which are generally used to power other conventionally-powered submarines, the new lithium-ion batteries will reportedly allow the KSS-III to cruise at greater speeds with a greater period of underwater endurance, life-expectancy and durability. Incidentally, Korea is only the second country in the world to field submarines equipped with lithium-ion batteries; the first is Japan - which utilizes lithium-ion battery technology aboard its s.

The design also incorporates ten (K-VLS) cells (compared to six on the Batch-I) - which are presumably to carry the Hyunmoo 4-4 ballistic missiles and the future Chonryong land-attack cruise missile.

Instrumentation

Armament
Torpedoes – The KSS-III is equipped with six  forward-firing torpedo tubes, for firing the "Tiger Shark" heavyweight torpedoes, developed by LIG Nex1.
In stark contrast, the Batch-II submarines will be equipped to ten K-VLS cells - presumably for carrying the Hyunmoo 4-4 - as well as the future Chonryong land-attack cruise missile, currently in development.
Weapon Handling System – The Batch-I vessels are also equipped with a "Weapons Handling and Launch System" (WHLS) - developed by UK-based naval conglomerate Babcock International.

Sensors
The Batch-I series is currently equipped with an assortment of different sensors and equipment, including:
Combat Management Suite – A "Naval Shield Integrated Combat Management System" (ICMS), developed by Hanhwa.
Sonar – A sonar suite, developed by LIG Nex1, comprising:-
 Flank-array sonar (FAS)
 Towed-array sonar
 Intercept-passive sonar
 Continuous-active sonar (CAS)
 Mine-avoidance sonar, developed by Thales
Electronic warfare – "Pegaso" radar electronic support-measures (RESM), developed by Indra.
Other systems
"Series 30 Attack and Search" optronic mast, developed by Safran.
Noise-analysis/noise-reduction technology, developed by LIG Nex1.
Steering-consoles, developed by ECA Group.

Construction

Batch-I
On 26 December 2012 - South Korea's Ministry of National Defense (MND) contracted DSME to build the first two Batch-I submarines - at an estimated cost of USD $1.56 billion. On 30 November 2016 - the MND contracted HHI to build the third submarine of the series.

The construction of the first submarine began in November 2014, with a "steel-cutting" ceremony at DSME's shipyard in Okpo, South Korea The submarine, christened as the Dosan Ahn Chnagho, was launched in an elaborate ceremony on  14 September 2018 - an event that was attended by senior representatives from South Korea's government and military, including South Korean president Moon Jae-in. Dosan Ahn Changho began its sea trials in June 2019 and was commissioned into the ROKN on 13 August 2021.

Work on the second submarine began - with the laying of its keel in July 2016. Christened as the Ahn Mu, the submarine was launched on 10 November 2020. It is scheduled to be delivered by 2022.

The construction of the third and final submarine began in June 2017, at HHI's shipbuilding facility in Ulsan, South Korea. Christened as the Shin Chae-ho, the submarine was launched on 28 September 2021. It is scheduled to be delivered by 2024.

Batch-II
On 11 October 2019, South Korea's Defense Acquisition Program Administration (DAPA) contracted DSME to design and build the first Batch-II submarine - at an estimated cost KRW ₩1.11 trillion. On 10 September 2019, DSME was again contracted to build the second Batch-II submarine - at an estimated cost of ₩985.7 billion.

The construction of the first submarine - the Lee Bong-chang, began in August 2021 and is scheduled to be delivered to the ROKN in 2026. The construction of the second submarine began in December 2021 and is scheduled to be delivered to the ROKN by 2028.

Export variants

DSME-2000

The DSME-2000 displaces at 2,000 tonnes and is larger than South Korea's  (based on the Type 209/1400 design) and the Son Won-il class (based on the Type 214 design), but is smaller than the Dosan Ahn Changho class.

The design incorporates an arrangement of eight  forward-firing torpedo tubes, with a pack of 16 torpedoes - although this can be combined with an assortment of naval mines and anti-ship missiles. The submarine's design also features a flexible weapon launching system - which can be tailored according to the customer's requirements.

Similar to the KSS-III, the DSME-2000 will also be equipped with an AIP module and lithium-ion batteries. The design also includes an assortment of equipment, including -

 A sonar suite, equipped with :-
Cylindrical Hydrophone Array
Intercept Detection and Ranging Sonar
Flank Array Sonar
Passive Ranging Sonar
Active Operation Sonar
Towed Array Sonar
A mast-sensor suite, equipped with :-
Electronic support measures (ESM)
Satellite communication (SATCOM)
Radar
Up to two communication retractable masts
Optronics

DSME-3000

DSME has offered a 3,000-tonne variant of the KSS-III, known as the DSME-3000 to the Indian Navy, under the latter's Project-75 (India) (P-75I) submarine procurement initiative. The DSME-3000 was first displayed to the public at the 2021 convention of the "International Maritime Defense Industry Exhibition" (MADEX), held at Busan, South Korea.

The DSME-3000 will be equipped with lithium-ion batteries and a fuel-cell powered AIP system, as on the KSS-III; however, the variant being offered to India lacks the K-VLS cells, which are standard on both Batch-I and Batch-II submarines being built for the Republic of Korea Navy.

DSME entered the competition in April 2019 and was later shortlisted as a finalist, along with four other international shipyards - ThyssenKrupp Marine Systems (TKMS), Rubin Design Bureau, Navantia and Naval Group. As of September 2021, the firm is reported to be the only remaining contender; the other four contenders either withdrew or were disqualified from the program, on account of varying reasons.

Ships in the class

See also

Submarines of similar era and comparison
 Type 212CD submarine - An exclusive class of attack submarines developed by ThyssenKrupp Marine Systems for the German Navy and the Royal Norwegian Navy.
 Type 218SG submarine - An exclusive class of attack submarines developed by ThyssenKrupp Marine Systems for the Republic of Singapore Navy.
  - A unique class of  diesel-electric attack-submarines developed by ThyssenKrupp Marine Systems and currently being built for Israel.
 S-80 Plus submarine - A class of conventionally-powered attack-submarines developed by Navantia for the Spanish Navy.
  - A class of next-generation attack submarines developed by Kockums for the Swedish Navy
  -  A class of diesel-electric attack-submarines developed by Mitsubishi Heavy Industries and Kawasaki Shipbuilding Corporation for the Japan Maritime Self-Defense Force.
  - A class of diesel-electric attack submarines currently being built by Mitsubishi Heavy Industries and Kawasaki Heavy Industries for the Japan Maritime Self-Defense Force
  - A class of diesel-electric attack-submarines developed by Rubin Design Bureau for Russia.

Other references to the Republic of Korea Navy
List of active Republic of Korea Navy ships

References

Attack submarines
Submarines of the Republic of Korea Navy
Proposed ships